Jacob "Jake" R. Day (born July 3, 1982) is an American politician. Born and raised in Salisbury, Day is a member of the 110th Information Operations Battalion in the Maryland Army National Guard. Day represented District 2 of Salisbury in the City Council, served as the Council President from 2013 to 2015, and as the mayor of Salisbury from 2015 to 2023.

On January 17, 2023, Governor-elect Wes Moore nominated Day to serve as the Maryland Secretary of Housing and Community Development. He took office on January 18, 2023. He resigned as mayor of Salisbury on January 27.

Background
Day was one of three children born to father Randy Day, the CEO of Perdue Farms as of March 2017, and mother Debbie, a retired teacher. He grew up in Salisbury and pursued a career in architecture and urban design. He earned master's degrees from Carnegie Mellon University and the University of Oxford.

On July 8, 2015, Day announced his candidacy in the nonpartisan Salisbury mayoral election, challenging incumbent Democratic mayor Jim Ireton. Ireton later decided against running for re-election, instead running for the Salisbury City Council in District 4. He ran on a platform that included improving the city's infrastructure, attracting economic growth through business-first initiatives, and creating jobs. Day ran unopposed, and was elected on November 3, 2015.

Mayor of Salisbury
Day was sworn in as the mayor of Salisbury on November 16, 2015. He was subsequently re-elected in 2019. He also served as the President for the Maryland Municipal League from 2021 to 2022. During his time in office, the city experienced a nearly 30 percent growth in the number of manufacturing jobs, a 175 percent increase in the total existing housing in Salisbury, and a decrease in statistical crime rates in the city every year since 2017. The city's S&P Global Ratings bond rating also improved to AA.

Day announced that he would resign as mayor on January 17, 2023, the same day that Governor-elect Wes Moore nominated him to serve as the Maryland Secretary of Housing. He recommended Salisbury City Council president Jack Heath as the Acting Mayor, which was approved by the City Council that evening. His resignation went into effect on January 27, 2023.

Downtown revitalization 

As mayor of Salisbury, one of Day's biggest objectives was revitalizing the downtown area of the city, saying in November 2015 that he hoped Salisbury would one day be able to compete with other small cities in Maryland such as Frederick. His administration focused heavily on reshaping the city's streets, undertaking projects including the revitalization of the city's Main Street, Fitzwater Street, the Downtown Plaza, and the Riverwalk. Much of this was in preparation for the National Folk Festival, which the city hosted annually from 2019 to 2022, and beginning in 2023 the Maryland Folk Festival.

Day's administration also oversaw the launch of the "Housing First" policy in 2017, which places homeless residents in houses or apartments. Salisbury was the first small city in the United States to adopt a Housing First program, which was previously adopted in larger cities including New York City, Los Angeles, and Washington, D.C.. In September 2021, Day announced the "Here is Home" initiative to build a tiny home village to house the homeless.

In March 2017, in an effort to keep Salisbury University graduates in the city, Day collaborated with SU President Janet Dudley-Eshbach to launch the Buy a Home, Build a Business program, which offered $5,000 of downpayment, legal guidance, business development advice, and closing cost assistance to graduates looking to start a business in Salisbury.

In February 2018, Day announced a partnership between Salisbury, Salisbury University, and Spin for a dockless bike sharing program.

In March 2019, Day adopted the Vision Zero policy, which sought to eliminate all pedestrian deaths and serious injuries caused by vehicles by January 2030. As of November 2022, injury accidents have fallen 19 percent and all categories of accidents have declined since the policy's adoption.

In June 2021, Day announced a collaboration between Salisbury and Bird, which debuted rentable electric scooters in the city, replacing the previous Spin bikes.

COVID-19 pandemic response 
In March 2020, Day declared a state of emergency for the COVID-19 pandemic in Salisbury. In April, he implemented occupancy limits in retailers and commercial facilities to limit the spread of the COVID-19 virus, as well as social distancing protocols, and worked with Annapolis mayor Gavin Buckley to support the #MayorsWithMasks initiative, which promoted the use of face coverings while outdoors. In May, he announced a number of measures to protect small business and renters from the affects of the pandemic. These included a ban on rent increases under a state of emergency. an allotment of over $100,000 for those whose wages have been affected by the pandemic, and donating 5,000 masks to those living in low-income neighborhoods.

2020 deployment

Day enlisted in the United States Army in 2009. On May 28, 2020, Day announced that he would be deployed to the Horn of Africa for 10 months with the Combined Joint Task Force – Horn of Africa through the Maryland Army National Guard. In his absence, City Administrator Julia Glanz acted as the mayor of Salisbury, effective from June 4, 2020, until his return on May 21, 2021. He was promoted to the rank of Major, on November 28, 2020, during his deployment. Day was deployed again in Estonia and Latvia from May to June 2022.

At the time of his deployment, Day was one of three U.S. mayors deployed during their terms in office, including Pete Buttigieg from South Bend, Indiana and Brent Taylor from North Ogden, Utah.

In April 2021, Day was named in a report from the Maryland National Guard Bureau Office of Equity and Inclusion, in which he was accused of receiving and not forwarding reports of discrimination against Sergeant Bruce Weaver, a Black soldier who alleges that his all-white trainers forced him to wear a chain during training at the Delaware Army National Guard officer candidate school, in 2015. The Maryland National Guard exonerated its personnel after "several internal investigations" and appealed the bureau's decision. Day rejected claims of discrimination, releasing a statement on social media saying "I am pained to have my name spoken in relation to the 2015 incident I was not even present to witness".

Maryland Secretary of Housing

On January 17, 2023, Governor-elect Wes Moore nominated Day to serve as the Maryland Secretary of Housing and Community Development. He took office on January 18. His nomination was unanimously approved by the Maryland Senate on February 17.

Personal life
Day lives in the Camden neighborhood of Salisbury with his daughters named Lilly and Olivia.

Political positions

Environment
In April 2017, Day said he opposed the Trump administration's decision to cut funding toward Chesapeake Bay cleanup programs from the federal budget. In October 2021, he attended a virtual discussion hosted by U.S. Senator Ben Cardin, where he emphasized the need for federal and state support to support their climate change mitigation and resiliency plans.

In November 2022, Day signed into law a city ordinance that would ban plastic bags in retail stores and restaurants. The ban will go into effect on July 1, 2023.

Labor
In May 2022, Day said he supported a proposed charter amendment to extend collective bargaining rights to all city employees. The charter amendment was unanimously approved by the Salisbury City Council in September 2022.

Social issues
In 2014, after a Daily Times investigation found that minorities made up only one-sixth of the city's staff members despite making up 47 percent of the city's population, Day called for measures to increase government diversity.

In July 2014, Day supported increasing Salisbury's city council districts from two to five, with two of the newly drawn districts being majority minority districts. The district map, which was supported by the American Civil Liberties Union of Maryland and the Wicomico County NAACP, was adopted by the Salisbury city council by a 4–1 vote in September 2014.

In August 2017, following the Unite the Right rally in Charlottesville, Virginia, Day joined more than 300 municipal leaders in backing an initiative that called for implementing anti-hate and anti-bias education in schools and law enforcement agencies, ensuring aggressive enforcement of civil rights laws, and strengthening hate crime laws.

In June 2017, Day called for the removal of a memorial of Confederate general John Henry Winder from the lawn of the old Wicomico County courthouse in Salisbury. In January 2020, Day established the Lynching Memorial Task Force, a group that would research creating a permanent monument to commemorate African-Americans lynched in Wicomico County. In July 2020, Day celebrated the removal of the Winder memorial, and in June 2021, he dedicated a new memorial in its place to Matthew Williams, a Black man who was lynched in Salisbury in 1931.

Statewide and national politics
In October 2018, Day endorsed Governor Larry Hogan for re-election in the 2018 Maryland gubernatorial election. In March 2021, he endorsed Comptroller Peter Franchot for Governor of Maryland.

In November 2019, Day endorsed South Bend mayor Pete Buttigieg in the 2020 Democratic Party presidential primaries.

In July 2021, Day endorsed former state delegate Heather Mizeur in the 2022 United States House of Representatives election in Maryland's 1st congressional district.

Electoral history

References

External links

Campaign website

Mayors of places in Maryland
Carnegie Mellon University alumni
University System of Maryland alumni
University of Maryland, College Park alumni
Alumni of the University of Oxford
United States Army soldiers
Living people
People from Salisbury, Maryland
21st-century American politicians
State cabinet secretaries of Maryland
Military personnel from Maryland
1982 births